13 Days to Die is a 1965 Italian and West German spy film drama, directed by Manfred R. Köhler and Alberto Cardone.

The film was based on an updated pre-World War II German pulp fiction character named Rolf Torring.

Cast

External links
 

1965 films
1960s spy thriller films
1960s action adventure films
German spy thriller films
Italian spy thriller films
German action adventure films
Italian action adventure films
West German films
1960s Italian-language films
1960s German-language films
German multilingual films
Italian multilingual films
Films directed by Manfred R. Köhler
Films directed by Alberto Cardone
Films set in Thailand
Films based on German novels
1960s multilingual films
1960s Italian films
1960s German films